The name Dog was used for three tropical cyclones in the Atlantic Ocean.

 Hurricane Dog (1950), a category 4 hurricane
 Hurricane Dog (1951), a Category 1 hurricane that passed through the Central Windward islands
 Tropical Storm Dog (1952), a strong tropical storm that never threatened land

Atlantic hurricane set index articles